Hymns and Spiritual Songs may refer to:

 Hymns and Spiritual Songs (book), a 1765 book by Christopher Smart
 Hymns and Spiritual Songs (album), a 2007 album by Bradley Joseph